The 1808 United States presidential election in Massachusetts took place between November 1 and 8, 1808, as part of the 1808 United States presidential election. Voters chose 19 representatives, or electors to the Electoral College, who voted for President and Vice President.

During this election, the Federalist candidate Charles C. Pinckney along with his running mate Rufus King ran unopposed in the state. However, both would ultimately lose the election nationally to the chosen Democratic-Republican candidate James Madison and his running mate George Clinton

Results

See also
 United States presidential elections in Massachusetts

Notes

References

Massachusetts
1808
1808 Massachusetts elections